The 1951 Dayton Flyers football team was an American football team that represented the University of Dayton as an independent during the 1951 college football season. In their fifth season under head coach Joe Gavin, the Flyers compiled a 7–3 record and lost to Houston in the 1952 Salad Bowl.

Schedule

References

Dayton
Dayton Flyers football seasons
Dayton Flyers football